Van Diemen is a British race car manufacturer.

It may also refer to:

People
 Anthony van Diemen, Dutch colonial governor
 Patrick van Diemen, a Dutch football player

Places
 Van Diemen Gulf, а gulf in Australia
 Van Diemen's Land, the former name for Tasmania
 Van Diemen Strait, also known as Osumi Strait, separating Kyushu from the Nansei Islands

See also
 Cape Maria van Diemen
 Van Diemen's Land (disambiguation)